Boylan is an Irish surname. Notable people with the surname include:

 Andrew Boylan (disambiguation), multiple people, including:
Andrew Boylan (bishop) (1842–1910), Irish prelate of the Roman Catholic Church 
Andrew Boylan (politician) (born 1939), Irish Fine Gael politician
 Barbara Boylan (born 1942), American dancer and television personality
 Brett Boylan (born 1971), Australian Paralympic wheelchair rugby player
 Cathal Boylan (born 1964), Northern Irish politician
 Christine Boylan (born 1977), American television writer and producer
 Clare Boylan (1948–2006), Irish author, journalist and critic
 Dean Boylan (born 1951), American ice hockey defenseman
 Donal Boylan (fl. 2001), Irish Gaelic footballer and Australian rules footballer
 Eileen April Boylan (born 1987), American film and television actress
 Grace Duffie Boylan (1861–1935), American writer
 Ian Boylan (born 1983), American basketball player
 Jennifer Finney Boylan (born 1958), American author and transgender activist
 Jim Boylan (born 1955), American basketball coach
 John Boylan (disambiguation), multiple people, including:
John Boylan (American actor) (1912–1994), American film, television and stage actor
John Boylan (Canadian actor), Canadian film and television actor
John Boylan (record producer) (born 1941), American music producer and songwriter
John H. Boylan (1907–1981), Vermont politician
John J. Boylan (1878–1938), US Congressman
John Joseph Boylan (bishop) (1889–1953), third Roman Catholic Bishop of Rockford, Illinois
 Kieran Boylan, Irish drug dealer
 Krew Boylan (born c. 1982), Australian television actress
 Larry Boylan (1908–1997), American educator
 Laura Boylan (born 1991), Irish cricketer
 Lee Boylan (born 1978), English football striker
 Lydia Boylan (born 1987), Irish racing cyclist
 Lynn Boylan (born 1976), Irish politician and Member of the European Parliament 
 Malcolm Stuart Boylan (1897–1967), American screenwriter, writer, and founder of the U.S. Coast Guard Auxiliary
 Peter J. Boylan, U.S. Army Major General and college president
 Roger Boylan (born 1951), American writer
 Seán Boylan (born 1949), Gaelic football manager
 Steven A. Boylan (born 1965), U.S. military spokesman
 Terence Boylan, American singer/songwriter
 Terence Boylan (politician) (1910–1991), Irish Fianna Fáil politician and businessman
 William Boylan (1869–1940), American first President of Brooklyn College

Fictional characters

 Blazes Boylan, fictional character in James Joyce's novel Ulysses
 Iola Boylan, fictional character on the television series Mama's Family

See also
 Boylen, surname
 Boylan Act, 1914 New York state legislation
 Boylan Bottling Company, soft drink manufacturer in New York City
 Boylan Catholic High School, located in Rockford, Illinois
 Boylan Heights, neighborhood of Raleigh, North Carolina

Anglicised Irish-language surnames
Surnames of Irish origin